Bazhong railway station is a railway station in Bazhou District, Bazhong, Sichuan, China. It is the southern terminus of the Guangyuan–Bazhong railway and the northern terminus of the Bazhong–Dazhou railway.

History 
On 11 January 2016, the Bazhong–Dazhou railway opened. The service provision was a direct service to Chongqing with a journey time of just over five hours, and a direct service to Chengdu with a journey time of approximately 7.5 hours.

On 25 October 2019, the China Railway CR200J "Fuxing" EMU served the station for the first time. The journey time between Bazhong and Chengdu was reduced to five hours.

References 

Railway stations in Sichuan